Enayat Allah Ibrahim (1898–1972) was an Egyptian painter. His work was part of the painting event in the art competition at the 1924 Summer Olympics.

References

External links
 

1898 births
1972 deaths
20th-century Egyptian painters
Egyptian painters
Olympic competitors in art competitions